Björn Rehnquist was the champion in 2008; however, he chose to not participate this year.
Olivier Rochus became the new winner, after won against Igor Sijsling in the final.

Seeds

Draw

Final four

Top half

Bottom half

References
 Main Draw
 Qualifying Draw

Manchester Trophy - Singles
Aegon Manchester Trophy